Southern Cross University (SCU) is an Australian public university, with campuses at Lismore and Coffs Harbour in northern New South Wales, and at Coolangatta, the most southern suburb of the Gold Coast in Queensland.
It is ranked in the top 100 young universities in the world by the Times Higher Education World University Rankings.

History 
The initial predecessor institution to Southern Cross University was the Lismore Teachers' College, which commenced operation on 23 February 1970, at what is now the Northern Rivers Conservatorium site. On 1 September 1971, the Lismore Teachers College became a College of Advanced Education, under the Higher Education Act 1969, with the institution soon renamed Northern Rivers College of Advanced Education in 1973. Dr (later Professor) Rod Treyvaud was appointed principal in 1984, and oversaw an extensive building programme and the introduction of six new degree courses.

Following the publication of the Commonwealth Government's White Paper on Higher Education in 1988 and its emphasis on the development of larger tertiary education institutions in Australia, Northern Rivers College of Advanced Education agreed to an association with the University of New England (UNE). On 17 July 1989 the Northern Rivers CAE thus became part of network University of New England, with some 1800 staff and some 9500 EFTSU (effective full-time student units).

There was however dissatisfaction with the new network university, and on 29 June 1993 the federal and state ministers for education jointly announced that a new university would be established in the North Coast of NSW, which would consist of campuses at Lismore (formerly UNE - Northern Rivers) and Coffs Harbour (formerly UNE - Coffs Harbour Centre). It was subsequently announced that the new institution would be called Southern Cross University. Appropriate legislation was passed by both houses of the New South Wales Parliament in October 1993, and received the Royal Assent on 9 November 1993. Southern Cross University was formally established on 1 January 1994.

In 2010, Southern Cross University opened a new campus in the southern Gold Coast area of Queensland, at Coolangatta just 400 metres from North Kirra Beach and adjacent to the Gold Coast International Airport. Views of the Pacific Ocean can be seen from many vantage points in the campus' buildings. The Foundation Building was opened in 2010 and a second 10-story building opened in February 2013.

In 2019 a new health sciences building was opened at the Coffs Harbour campus funded from the Australian Government’s Community Development Grants program. Degrees in nursing, midwifery, occupational therapy and sport exercise science are offered in the new space.

Governance 
The University is governed by a Council, to which the Chief Executive Officer (the Vice-Chancellor) reports. The Council is responsible for the management of the University's affairs. The major academic body providing advice to Council on academic matter is the Academic Board. The Council has 15 members, including the Chancellor, the Vice Chancellor, the Chair of the Academic Board, two members appointed by the Minister, six members appointed by Council, three elected staff members and one elected student member.

Campuses

Lismore 

Lismore is a regional city located in the Northern Rivers region of NSW. The Lismore campus is set on more than 75 hectares, and houses specialist training teaching facilities including a science and engineering precinct, environmental laboratories, contemporary music and visual arts studios and the SCU Health Clinic. The Learning Centre, at the centre of the campus, features individual and collaborative learning spaces. As of 2021, 1,805 students study on campus at Lismore.

Gold Coast 

The Gold Coast campus is the only Australian university campus located at an airport. The campus is at Coolangatta, in Queensland, close to North Kirra Beach and adjacent to the Gold Coast Airport. The campus includes general teaching facilities, as well as specialist teaching facilities for nursing and midwifery, and allied heath disciplines such as occupational therapy, podiatry, pedorthics and speech pathology. Tourism, business, information technology, law, education, arts and social welfare are also taught at the Gold Coast. As of 2021, 5,592 students study at the Gold Coast campus.

Coffs Harbour 

The Coffs Harbour campus is located on the mid-north coast of New South Wales, and consists of general teaching facilities, and specialist nursing laboratories, teaching spaces for education students, a biosciences laboratory, and psychology research facilities. The campus is shared with a senior high school and a technical college and hosts 1,259 on-campus students as of 2021.

National Marine Science Centre 
Southern Cross University operates the National Marine Science Centre (NMSC) in Coffs Harbour on the northern side of the city. The NMSC is an international leader in a range of marine research fields, conducting research projects around the world. Research at the National Marine Science Centre (NMSC) addresses critical challenges to the future of the marine environment across four broad areas: Biodiversity, Ecological Interactions, Aquaculture and Sustainable Fisheries. Facilities at the NMSC include a flow-through seawater system that supplies labs, tank farm, aquarium room and hatchery. The Centre also operates the Solitary Islands Aquarium which is open to the public.

Sydney and Melbourne 
Southern Cross University operates The Hotel School Sydney and The Hotel School Melbourne in partnership with Mulpha Australia. Both The Hotel School Sydney and The Hotel School Melbourne are located in the central business districts of their respective cities and have executive offices and teaching facilities. Southern Cross University also operates branch campuses in Sydney and Melbourne, delivering business and accounting degrees to undergraduate and postgraduate international students.

Academic and research programs 
The University offers a range of undergraduate and postgraduate academic programs and is organised into four academic Faculties and two colleges.
  Faculty of Business, Law and Arts
  Faculty of Education
  Faculty of Health
  Faculty of Science and Engineering
  Gnibi College of Indigenous Australian Peoples
  SCU College

Research centres 
The research centres provide research and solutions that allow students to gain knowledge and learn alongside people making history in a wide range of research fields.

 Centre for Children and Young People
 Centre for Coastal Biogeochemistry
 Centre for Organics Research
 Centre for Peace and Social Justice
 Forest Research Centre
 National Centre for Flood Research
 Marine Ecology Research Centre
 National Marine Science Centre
 Southern Cross GeoScience
 National Centre for Naturopathic Medicine

University rankings 

Southern Cross University is ranked 33rd in Australia according to the QS World University Rankings, falling the bottom 15% among the included Australian public universities.

The university has been ranked at the 101-110th best universities in the Asia-Pacific region for 2019 by the Times Higher Education World University Rankings. Southern Cross University is rated 'at world standard' or above in 24 research areas by Excellence in Research for Australia 2015, and ranked number one in Australia for International student support for the third consecutive year. SCU was ranked number two in Australia for overall learning experience by the International Student Barometer 2015.

The Master of Business Administration (MBA) program is rated 4 out of 5 stars by the Graduate Management Association of Australia (GMAA)

Research 
Staff and students at Southern Cross University undertake research in a wide range of areas, including  civil engineering, crop and pasture production,  complementary and alternative medicine, ecology, education, environmental science and management,  fisheries sciences, forestry sciences, geochemistry, human movement and sports science, human rights research, information technology, nursing, oceanography,  policy and administration, philosophy and ethics, resources engineering and extractive metallurgy, tourism, and zoology.

Community engagement 

A priority for SCU is community engagement. For example, SCU has played a leading role in the development of a regional strategy to improve freight and supply chain services across the Northern Rivers, under the title From Roots to Routes A ground up approach to freight and supply chain planning for the Northern Rivers NSW.

Notable people 

The current and fifth Chancellor of the University since July 2021 is Sandra McPhee AM. Ms McPhee is the NSW Public Service Commission Advisory Board chair and has broad experience as a director of companies and other organisations including Tourism Australia, AGL Energy, Westfield, Perpetual, the Coles Group, Fairfax Media, Australia Post, South Australia Water and Kathmandu. The current Vice-Chancellor and President of the University since September 2020 is Professor Tyrone Carlin.

See also 

 List of universities in Australia
 Kenvale College of Tourism & Hospitality Management, an institution with an articulation agreement with the Hotel School in partnership with Southern Cross University

References

External links 

 
Art schools in Australia
Australian vocational education and training providers
Distance education institutions based in Australia
Nursing schools in Australia
Universities in New South Wales
Universities in Queensland
Educational institutions established in 1994
1994 establishments in Australia
Education in Coffs Harbour
Lismore, New South Wales